In statistical mechanics, the Rushbrooke inequality relates the critical exponents of a magnetic system which exhibits a first-order phase transition in the thermodynamic limit for non-zero temperature T.

Since the Helmholtz free energy  is extensive, the normalization to free energy per site is given as

The magnetization M per site in the thermodynamic limit, depending on the external magnetic field H and temperature T is given by

where  is the spin at the i-th site, and the magnetic susceptibility and specific heat at constant temperature and field are given by, respectively

and

Definitions

where

measures the temperature relative to the critical point.

Derivation
For the magnetic analogue of the Maxwell relations for the response functions, the relation

follows, and with thermodynamic stability requiring that , one has

which, under the conditions  and the definition of the critical exponents gives

which gives the Rushbrooke inequality

Remarkably, in experiment and in exactly solved models, the inequality actually holds as an equality.

Critical phenomena
Statistical mechanics